Sachie Yuki (born March 23, 1968) is a Japanese former competitive figure skater. She placed 5th at the 1983 World Junior Championships, held in December 1982 in Sarajevo, Yugoslavia. Competing internationally on the senior level, she won the bronze medal at the 1983 Ennia Challenge Cup, silver at the 1983 Prague Skate, silver at the 1985 Prague Skate, and bronze at the 1985 Danubius Thermal Trophy. She became a three-time Japanese national medalist, winning silver in 1985–86 and bronze in 1982–83 and 1984–85.

Competitive highlights

References 

1968 births
Japanese female single skaters
Living people